Eugenia bayatensis is a species of plant in the family Myrtaceae. It is endemic to Cuba.

References

Endemic flora of Cuba
bayatensis
Endangered plants
Taxonomy articles created by Polbot